Jaka Hvala (born 15 July 1993) is a retired Slovenian ski jumper. In 2013, he became a Junior World Champion. His personal best jump is 213 metres, set in 2012 in Planica.

Career 
Hvala made his World Cup debut in 2012 in Zakopane where he finished 29th. After some World Cup break, he gained points in Lahti with ninth place and in Oslo with eighth place. His first World Cup victory was in Klingenthal, at the large hill, in 2013. He received an individual silver medal in 2012 and a bronze medal at the 2010 Junior World Championships in the team competition.

In World Cup, Hvala won three team events with the Slovenian national team. He retired from professional ski jumping in August 2020.

World Cup

Standings

Individual wins

References

External links 

1993 births
Living people
Slovenian male ski jumpers
21st-century Slovenian people